The .40-60 Winchester (or .40-60 WCF) is a rimmed, tapered centerfire rifle cartridge designed for use in lever-action rifles by Winchester Repeating Arms Company in 1884.

Description and performance
The .40-60 Winchester is a centerfire rifle cartridge intended for 19th-century big-game hunting.

Winchester Repeating Arms Company necked down the .45-60 Winchester cartridge to hold a bullet with improved ballistics for the Winchester Model 1876 rifle. The lever-action Model 1876's advantage of faster loading for subsequent shots was eclipsed two years later by the stronger and smoother Winchester Model 1886 action capable of handling longer cartridges with heavier bullets. 

The .40-60 and similarly short cartridges designed for the Model 1876 rifle faded into obsolescence as 20th-century hunters preferred more powerful smokeless powder loadings of cartridges designed for stronger rifles. Winchester production of .40-60 cartridges ended during the great depression.

Dimensions

See also
 List of Winchester Center Fire cartridges
 List of cartridges by caliber
 List of rifle cartridges
 .40 S&W
 10mm Auto
 .41 Action Express

References

External links

 40-60 Winchester
 Winchester 40-60 W.C.F. For 1876 Model Winchesters

Pistol and rifle cartridges
Winchester Repeating Arms Company cartridges